Abdallah Al- Nafisi (in Arabic عبد_الله_النفيسي- born 1945 in Kuwait ) is a Kuwaiti politician and academic. He graduated from The University of Cambridge in 1972. He was a member of National Assembly of Kuwait in 1985.

Education and academia
He earned his bachelor's degree from the American University of Beirut in 1967 and a PhD in political science from Churchill College at Cambridge University in Britain in 1972.

Abdullah Al-Nafisi has worked as a professor of political science and president at College of Political Science of Kuwait University and at Al Ain University in the United Arab Emirates. He has a doctorate in political science from the University of Cambridge. Between 1973 and 1980, he was active as a visiting professor at Peking University, Moscow State University, Harvard, Cambridge, Stanford and the University of Exeter.

Books
The role of Shi’a in the modern political development of Iraq (PhD. thesis – Cambridge University 1972 – That Al Salasil – Kuwait).
Conflict in Dhofar (1975, Dar Al-Politics, Kuwait).
Kuwait, The Other Opinion (1978, Taha House – London).
Islam Rule (1980 Dar Taha – London).
Sharia Policy (1980, Taha House – Kuwait).
Gulf Cooperation Council: The Strategic Framework (1982 Dar Taha – London).
The Islamic Movement: Gaps in the Road (1986 Dar Al-Rubaian – Kuwait).
The role of students in political work (1986, the National Union of Kuwaiti Students – Kuwait)

References

External links

1945 births
Living people
Alumni of Churchill College, Cambridge
American University of Beirut alumni
Academic staff of Kuwait University
Kuwaiti Muslims
Members of the National Assembly (Kuwait)
Muslim Brotherhood

ar:عبد الله النفيسي
simple:Abdullah Alnefisi